Corydoras fowleri is a species of armored catfish from the family Callichthyidae, found in the Western Amazon River Basin.

References 

https://www.fishbase.se/summary/46066
https://repository.si.edu/bitstream/handle/10088/16864/1/USNMP-116_3498_1964.pdf
https://www.tandfonline.com/doi/abs/10.1080/01650528609360697?journalCode=nnfe20

Corydoras
Fish described in 1950
Taxa named by Eugenia Brandt Böhlke